Sericostomatidae is a family of bushtailed caddisflies in the order Trichoptera. There are about 19 genera and at least 90 described species in Sericostomatidae.

The type genus for Sericostomatidae is Sericostoma P.A. Latreille, 1825.

Genera

References

Further reading

 
 
 
 
 
 
 
 

Trichoptera families
Integripalpia